Torres de Albanchez is a village located in the province of Jaén, southern Spain.

References

Municipalities in the Province of Jaén (Spain)